Dr. Paul Alfred Biefeld (22 March 1867 – 21 June 1943) was a German-American electrical engineer, astronomer and teacher.

Biography
Paul Alfred Biefeld was born in Jöhstadt, Saxony, Germany on March 22, 1867. He was the son of Heinrich and Wilhelmina (Glaeser) Biefeld, he moved to the United States in 1881. Biefeld received his B.S. in Electrical Engineering at the University of Wisconsin in 1894. He received his Ph.D. at the University of Zurich, Switzerland in 1900.

He married Emma Bausch, of Frankfurt am Main, on 11 April 1900. He was the Assistant Principal of Appleton Wisconsin high school 1894-1897. Paul was the lab assistant in Physics and Electrical Engineering at the ETH Zürich, 1899 – 1900. Biefeld was the professor of Physics and Electrical Engineering at the Hildburghausen Technikum, Germany 1900 – 1906. He was also the professor of Physics and Astronomy at the University of Akron, Akron, Ohio in 1906 and continued until 1911. He arrived at Denison University in 1911 where he was the professor and lecturer of Astronomy and the Director of the Warner and Swasey Observatory. He continued to teach at Denison University and lived in Granville, Ohio until his death in June 1943.

Biefeld joined the Yerkes Eclipse Expedition to Denver, Colorado in 1918. He was the research assistant at the Yerkes Observatory for the summer of 1919. Biefeld was part of the Yerkes Eclipse Expedition to Catalina Island in September 1923.

In popular culture

Biefeld–Brown effect
In popular culture Biefeld's name has come to be associated with the Biefeld–Brown effect, an electrical effect where extremely high voltages can produce a type of propulsion, usually attributed an ionic wind but also associated with several anti-gravity theories. The effect was named by inventor Thomas Townsend Brown, a former student of Biefeld at Denison University in Ohio. Brown claimed Biefeld as his mentor and co-experimenter although he seems to have named this effect many years after his association with Biefeld. Brown only attended Denison University for one year and their records show no evidence of any research or experiments being carried out by Biefeld/Brown during Biefeld's professorship there.

Brown himself seemed to think the effect demonstrated a connection between electricity and gravity, which he thought was being negated by the high voltage.

Association with Albert Einstein
Publications promoting the Biefeld–Brown effect/Electrogravitics/anti-gravity tend to emphasize Paul Biefeld's standing as a physicist via titling him a "colleague of Albert Einstein", based on the fact that Biefeld and Einstein attended ETH Zürich at the same time. Later in life Biefeld recounted that Einstein borrowed his class notes but there is little evidence of anything more than a passing acquaintance between the two students.

Affiliations
Member of the American Astronomical Society
Member of the Astronomical Society of the Pacific
Republican Party
Baptist

References

Who's Who in America 1924-1925 Vol. 13 Publisher A. N. Marquis & Company Chicago, 1924.
Maple Grove Cemetery Record 

1867 births
1940 deaths
University of Wisconsin–Madison College of Engineering alumni
People from Erzgebirgskreis
19th-century German physicists
20th-century American astronomers
German emigrants to the United States
People from the Kingdom of Saxony
Anti-gravity
20th-century American physicists
Denison University faculty
People from Granville, Ohio